The 2010 Amber Valley Borough Council election took place on 6 May 2010 to elect members of Amber Valley Borough Council in Derbyshire, England. One third of the council was up for election and the Conservative Party stayed in overall control of the council.

After the election, the composition of the council was:
Conservative 29
Labour 14
British National Party 2

Campaign
15 seats were contested in the election by a total of 50 candidates.

The Conservatives campaigned on their record of controlling the council for the previous 10 years, pointing to keeping council tax increases low and plans to regenerate local towns. However Labour pledged to appoint people as area managers who would be a contact point for people to bring any problems and planned to use compulsory purchase orders to bring empty properties into use. Meanwhile, the Liberal Democrats targeted seats in Belper and Duffield campaigning on regeneration, recycling and litter, while the British National Party hoped to increase on the 2 seats they held in Heanor.

Election result
The results saw no change in the party balance as Labour held the 8 seats they had been defending and the Conservatives the other 7 seats, meaning the Conservatives remained in control of the council. Neither the Liberal Democrats or British National Party won any seats, with the British National Party vote dropping in Heanor where it held 2 seats.

Ward results

References

2010 English local elections
May 2010 events in the United Kingdom
2010
2010s in Derbyshire